Quinaldine or 2-methylquinoline is an organic compound with the formula CH3C9H6N.  It is one of the methyl derivatives of the heterocyclic compound quinoline.  It is bioactive and is used in the preparation of various dyes.  It is a colorless oil but commercial samples can appear colored.

Production and reactions
Quinaldine is recovered from coal tar. It can be prepared from aniline and paraldehyde via Skraup synthesis or from aniline and crotonaldehyde via Doebner-von Miller variation of the Skraup reaction.

Hydrogenation of quinaldine gives 2-methyltetrahydroquinoline. This reduction can be conducted enantioselectively.

Properties
Quinaldine has critical point at 787 K and 4.9 MPa and its refractive index is 1.8116.

Uses
Quinaldine is used  in manufacturing anti-malaria drugs, dyes and food colorants (e.g., Quinoline Yellows, pinacyanol).  It is the precursor to the pH indicator Quinaldine Red. 

Quinaldine sulfate is an anaesthetic used in fish transportation. In some Caribbean islands it is used to facilitate the collection of tropical fish from reefs.

References

External links
 MSDS at Science Lab
  Method of purifying quinaldine
 

Quinolines